Jacobus Johannes Hermanus (Jaap) Pop (born 23 June 1941, Alphen aan den Rijn) is a former Dutch politician. Pop is a member of the Labour Party.

Early life 

Pop was born as one of three sons in 1941 in Alphen aan den Rijn. His father is Herman Pop who was a member of the Christian Historical Union party and served as mayor of Dinteloord between 1946 and 1973. Pop went on to study jurisprudence in Utrecht.

Career 

Pop served as mayor of several cities between 1975 and 2006. Pop succeeded Jan Dijkstra as mayor of Franeker in 1975. In 1981 he became the mayor of Tiel and he served in that position until 1988. He was the mayor of Alkmaar between 1988 and 1995. In 1995 he succeeded Elizabeth Schmitz as mayor of Haarlem. Pop retired in 2006 and he was succeeded by Bernt Schneiders as mayor of Haarlem.

In 2004, he became Officer in the Order of Orange-Nassau.

In 2008, he played the role of mayor in the film Ver van familie.

In 2016, Pop's work as mayor of Haarlem was part of an exhibition on Haarlem's mayors at Museum Haarlem, which also included former mayors Elizabeth Schmitz, Jan Reehorst and Bernt Schneiders.

References

External links 

 

1941 births
Living people
Labour Party (Netherlands) politicians
Mayors in Friesland
People from Franeker
Mayors in Gelderland
People from Tiel
Mayors of Alkmaar
Mayors of Haarlem